Soshenko is a surname. Notable people with the surname include:

Ivan Soshenko (1807-1876), Ukrainian painter
Gennadi Soshenko (born 1958), Russian footballer and coach

See also
Sosenko, Sošenko